Humberto Briseño Sierra (June 24, 1914 - November 1, 2003) was a Mexican lawyer.

References

20th-century Mexican lawyers
1914 births
2003 deaths